"If We Ever Meet Again" is a song by American producer Timbaland. It was released on December 1, 2009, as the fourth single from his third studio album Shock Value II (2009). The song features singer Katy Perry and served as the album's second worldwide single. Timbaland's brother Sebastian also has uncredited vocals at the end of the song. "If We Ever Meet Again" reached number one in the Czech Republic and New Zealand while peaking within the top 10 in Australia, Austria, Belgium, Canada, France, Germany, Ireland, Israel, Italy, Norway, Poland, Slovakia, Spain, Switzerland, and the United Kingdom. The song was later included on the deluxe edition of Perry's third studio album Teenage Dream.

Background
Timbaland told MTV that will.i.am's work on "I Gotta Feeling" by the Black Eyed Peas inspired him to make "If We Ever Meet Again": "When I did this song, I was in love with this record called..... you're gonna be surprised. The record didn't have anything to do with ['If We Ever Meet Again'], but when I heard [the Black Eyed Peas'] "I Gotta Feeling", I said, 'I want a record just like that on my album.' I said, 'I gotta do me a "I Gotta Feeling" record.' Me and one of my producers, Jim Beanz, we came up with this concept. I said, '["I Gotta Feeling"] is happy, but I like it.' It gives a good feeling". On the record, Timbaland sings, instead of raps: "It's not like it's incredible singing, but it made sense for me and it fits my voice," he explained. "To get somebody else to sing it, it might sound too overdone. I like it better with mistakes — I make mistakes. With me singing it, it gives it a different kind of swagger to it". Katy Perry sang the second verse, while Timbaland sang the first verse. In the chorus, both of them sang together. The last rap verse is performed by Timbaland's brother Sebastian, but he is uncredited.

Music video

The music video was filmed in December 2009. It was directed by Paul "Coy" Allen, who directed "Morning After Dark" and "Say Something". Timbaland told MTV that he wanted the video to be serious and maybe have Perry playing his guardian angel: "I wanna make something deep, I don't know if I wanna make it like a relationship. I wanna make it like she saved my life with whatever depression I was going through, whether it be drug depression, weight-loss depression — something..... Will she be around if I go through this again?". The song debuted with its video premiere on January 18, 2010, on UK music channels, charting at number one on many of the music channel video charts. The video, rather than focusing on a serious relationship, as mentioned above, focuses on the love story between a jewel thief (Julian Graham) and an art thief (Nadine Heimann), interspersed with Perry and Timbaland singing. In the original video Katy Perry appears in black girdle and black leather as in underwear, while Timbaland in the whole part of the clip was in a brown Jacket and with a flat cap on his head. The jewel thief and art thief take note of each other when both are present at an art exhibit opening.  The jewel thief steals a necklace, but caches it (rather than trying to remove it from the premises). The jewel thief is later taken in by police for questioning about an art theft, but is released when the art thief secretly returns what she has stolen. As the jewel thief leaves the police station, the art thief is waiting for him outside, and the two join forces (dressed in black clothes and masks) to steal the original necklace and painting from the beginning of the video.

Chart performance
In the Republic of Ireland, "If We Ever Meet Again" entered at number 15 on January 28, 2010, and week later rose to a current peak of number three.

Similarly, in the United Kingdom, the single entered at number 17 on January 31, 2010, and one week later jumped to its peak of number three. The single reached number one in New Zealand on February 15, 2010, ending Stan Walker's 10-week number one reign with "Black Box". The song was at number one for 4 weeks, before it was replaced at number one by J. Williams with "You Got Me".

The song originally peaked on the Billboard Hot 100 at number 98, but then re-entered at number 96 on the issue date April 10, 2010. It has peaked at number 37 in the United States, making it the third highest-charting single on the album.

Track listing
UK and Europe CD single
 "If We Ever Meet Again" (international radio edit) – 3:58
 "If We Ever Meet Again" (Digital Dog radio remix) – 3:35

UK digital download – EP
 "If We Ever Meet Again" (international radio edit) – 3:58
 "If We Ever Meet Again" (Digital Dog radio remix) – 3:26
 "If We Ever Meet Again" (Chew Fu Deja fix) – 5:07
 "If We Ever Meet Again" (Starsmith remix) – 5:21

US digital download – EP
 "If We Ever Meet Again" (radio edit) – 3:58
 "If We Ever Meet Again" (album version) – 4:53
 "If We Ever Meet Again" (instrumental) – 4:21

Charts

Weekly charts

Year-end charts

Certifications

Release history

References

Timbaland songs
Katy Perry songs
Song recordings produced by Timbaland
Dance-pop songs
2010 singles
Number-one singles in New Zealand
Songs written by Jim Beanz
Songs written by Timbaland
Male–female vocal duets
Interscope Records singles
Songs written by busbee
2009 songs
Blackground Records singles
Songs about parting